Dokuheh Rural District is a rural district (dehestan) in Seh Qaleh District, Sarayan County, South Khorasan Province, Iran. At the 2006 census, its population was 2,412, in 562 families.  The rural district has 35 villages.

References 

Rural Districts of South Khorasan Province
Sarayan County